Mark Hendrickson is an American football coach and former player with the University of Northern Iowa. He was the head football coach at the Western Illinois University from 2008 until his firing on November 20, 2012.

Coaching career
Hendrickson's first coaching job was at Georgia Tech as an assistant to Bill Curry in 1983. As part of the Georgia Tech coaching staff, Hendrickson won a national championship in 1990. In 1992, he was hired at the University of Iowa as an assistant to Hayden Fry. Following a brief stint at Southeast Missouri State University, he returned to Iowa, and was shortly thereafter hired as an assistant at Western Illinois. Hendrickson served as Offensive Coordinator from 1999 to 2007. While part of the Leatherneck coaching staff, WIU appeared in the playoffs in 2000, 2002, and 2003. He was named acting head coach in 2008, and later head coach in 2009. Hendrickson led the Leathernecks to the Division I FCS playoffs in 2010, where they won over Coastal Carolina and lost to #2 Appalachian State. The 2010 Leathernecks ended the 2010 season #17 in the Sports Network final poll and #20 in the FCS Coaches poll. Hendrickson finished second in the final voting for the 2010 Eddie Robinson Award, awarded by The Sports Network.

In the spring of 2019, Hendrickson joined his son's (Myers Hendrickson) staff at Kansas Wesleyan coaching the running backs and wide receivers.

Personal life
Hendrickson and his wife, Ericka, have three children. His son, Myers Hendrickson, is the current football head coach at Western Illinois.

Head coaching record

References

Living people
American football wide receivers
Georgia Tech Yellow Jackets football coaches
Iowa Hawkeyes football coaches
Northern Iowa Panthers football players
Southeast Missouri State Redhawks football coaches
Western Illinois Leathernecks football coaches
People from Keokuk County, Iowa
Year of birth missing (living people)